President Barrada is a 1920 German silent film directed by Erik Lund and Joseph Delmont.

The film's art direction was by Siegfried Wroblewsky.

Cast
In alphabetical order
 Hermann Bachmann
 Carl Bayer
 Michael Bohnen
 Alexander Delbosq
 Wilhelm Diegelmann
 Carl Geppert
 Max Gülstorff
 Leopoldine Konstantin
 Raoul Lange
 Magda Madeleine
 Beni Montano
 Hedwig Pauly-Winterstein
 Hermann Picha
 Karl Platen
 Paul Rehkopf
 Ferdinand Robert
 Arthur Schetter
 Eduard von Winterstein
 Max Wogritsch

References

Bibliography
 Hans-Michael Bock and Tim Bergfelder. The Concise Cinegraph: An Encyclopedia of German Cinema. Berghahn Books.

External links

1920 films
Films of the Weimar Republic
German silent feature films
Films directed by Joseph Delmont
Films directed by Erik Lund
German black-and-white films
1920s German films